The 3rd World Championships in Athletics, under the auspices of the International Association of Athletics Federations, were held in the Olympic Stadium in Tokyo, Japan between August 23 and September 1. 1517 athletes from 167 countries participated in the event. Japan hosted again the championship in 2007 in Osaka and Tokyo will host again the event in 2025 at the same venue.

The event is best-remembered for the men's long jump competition, when Carl Lewis made the best six-jump series in history, only to be beaten by Mike Powell, whose  jump broke Bob Beamon's long-standing world record from the 1968 Summer Olympics.

Men's results

Track
1983 | 1987 | 1991 | 1993 | 1995

Note: * Indicates athletes who ran in preliminary rounds.

Field
1983 | 1987 | 1991 | 1993 | 1995

1 Georg Andersen of Norway originally won the silver medal, but he was disqualified after he tested positive for steroids.

Women's results

Track
1983 | 1987 | 1991 | 1993 | 1995

Note: * Indicates athletes who ran in preliminary rounds.

Field
1983 | 1987 | 1991 | 1993 | 1995

Note: * Indicates athletes who only ran in the preliminary round and also received medals.

Medal table

See also
1991 in athletics (track and field)

References

External links
 IAAF 1991

 
World Athletics Championships
World
World Championships in Athletics
Sports competitions in Tokyo
International athletics competitions hosted by Japan
August 1991 sports events in Asia
September 1991 sports events in Asia
1991 in Tokyo
Athletics in Tokyo